Catocala haitzi is a moth in the family Erebidae first described by Otto Bang-Haas in 1936. It is found in Gansu, China.

References

haitzi
Moths described in 1936
Moths of Asia